Młyniec may refer to the following places:
Młyniec, Lublin Voivodeship (east Poland)
Młyniec, Lubusz Voivodeship (west Poland)
Młyniec, Warmian-Masurian Voivodeship (north Poland)